Maiabalaena is an extinct genus of baleen whale from the Oligocene of Oregon 33 million years ago consisting of one species: M. nesbittae. It lacks any form of dentition, indicating that baleen whales first evolved tooth loss before evolving baleen. It was likely an efficient suction feeder. The species name is in honor of Washington states leading paleontologist, Elizabeth Nesbitt.

References

Oligocene cetaceans
Prehistoric cetacean genera
Rupelian life
Oligocene mammals of North America
Whitneyan
Paleontology in Oregon
Fossil taxa described in 2018